Rock Key is a coral reef located within the Florida Keys National Marine Sanctuary. It lies to the southwest of Key West, within the Key West National Wildlife Refuge.  This reef is within a Sanctuary Preservation Area (SPA).

See also
 Sand Key
 Eastern Dry Rocks

External links
 Benthic Habitat Map

References

 NOAA National Marine Sanctuary Maps, Florida Keys West
 NOAA Website on Rock Key
 NOAA Navigational Chart 11446

Coral reefs of the Florida Keys